Zhang Jie (born January 31, 1958) is a Chinese physicist. He served as President of Shanghai Jiao Tong University from November 2006 to February 2017. He was elected a member of the Chinese Academy of Sciences in 2003. He was elected to the German Academy of Sciences Leopoldina on March 28, 2007. He was elected as foreign associate of the US National Academy of Sciences in 2012.

Biography
Zhang Jie was born in 1958 in Taiyuan, Shanxi, China. He received both his bachelor's degree and master's degree from Inner Mongolia University, and his Ph.D. degree from the Institute of Physics, Chinese Academy of Sciences (CAS) in 1988. From 1988 to 1998, he was a visiting scholar at the Max Planck Society in Germany and at Rutherford Appleton Laboratory in the United Kingdom. In 1999, he returned to China and worked as a research scientist at the CAS. He was appointed head of Bureau of Fundamental Science at the CAS in 2003. On November 27, 2006, Zhang replaced Xie Shengwu as President of Shanghai Jiao Tong University.

Zhang Jie has published more than 100 papers, 15 of which were in Science, Physical Review Letters, and other journals with an impact factor above 7.2. He has received numerous awards.

Zhang Jie is a member of the Board of Trustees of King Abdullah University of Science and Technology (KAUST).

Zhang Jie was an alternate member of the 17th and 18th CPC Central Committees.

References

1958 births
Living people
Alternate members of the 17th Central Committee of the Chinese Communist Party
Alternate members of the 18th Central Committee of the Chinese Communist Party
Chinese Communist Party politicians from Shanxi
Educators from Shanxi
Fellows of the Royal Academy of Engineering
Foreign associates of the National Academy of Sciences
Inner Mongolia University alumni
Members of the Chinese Academy of Sciences
People's Republic of China politicians from Shanxi
Physicists from Shanxi
Politicians from Taiyuan
Presidents of Shanghai Jiao Tong University
Academic staff of Shanghai Jiao Tong University
TWAS laureates